Hyptiotes analis is a species of spider of the genus Hyptiotes. It is endemic to Sri Lanka.

See also
 List of Uloboridae species

References

Uloboridae
Endemic fauna of Sri Lanka
Spiders of Asia
Spiders described in 1892